Mirpur University of Science & Technology (میرپور یونیورسٹی براۓ سائنس اور ٹیکنالوجی) was formerly a constituent college of University of Azad Jammu and Kashmir as University College of Engineering & Technology Mirpur. It is a state university.

Recognized university
This university is recognized by the Higher Education Commission of Pakistan.

History
The main campus of the university is situated on Allama Iqbal Road, Mirpur, Azad Kashmir and the Bhimber Campus is in District Bhimber.

The second campus is located on Allama Iqbal Road adjacent to Girls Degree College.

Campuses
 Main campus (Mirpur)
 Bhimber Campus
 Pallandri Campus (District Sudhanoti)
 Jari Kas Campus
 Nazara Campus

References 

Universities and colleges in Azad Kashmir
Public universities and colleges in Pakistan
Educational institutions established in 2008
2008 establishments in Pakistan